Beatin' the Odds is the fourteenth studio album by country artist Eddie Rabbitt, released in 1997 by Intersound Records. The album was recorded by Rabbitt after undergoing chemotherapy and having had a part of his lung removed to combat cancer. It was released eight months before his death. It included six new songs and six re-recordings of past hits including "I Love a Rainy Night" and "Drivin' My Life Away" from Horizon, "On Second Thought" and "American Boy" from Jersey Boy, "Two Dollars in the Jukebox" from Rocky Mountain Music and "Suspicions" from Loveline.

Despite Rabbitt's condition, Allmusic gave the album four stars and commented that "his vocal talent shines as brightly in this full-length offering as in any of the many others he completed during his long career."

Track listing
"Great Old American Town" (Eddie Rabbitt, Jenny Yates) - 3:53  
"It's Me I'm Runnin' From" (Tim Nichols, Rabbitt) - 3:21  
"I'll Make Everything Alright" (Robert Ellis Orrall, Rabbitt) - 2:33  
"You've Come to the Right Heart" (Nichols, Rabbitt) - 3:49  
"Love May Never Pass This Way Again" (Roger Cook, Rabbitt) - 3:26  
"I'm There" (Rabbitt, Jimmy Hyde) - 3:24  
"Drivin' My Life Away" (David Malloy, Rabbitt, Even Stevens) - 3:17  
"Suspicions"  (Malloy, Randy McCormick, Rabbitt, Stevens) - 4:58  
"Two Dollars in the Jukebox" (Rabbitt) - 2:23  
"I Love a Rainy Night" (Malloy, Rabbitt, Stevens) - 3:13  
"On Second Thought" (Rabbitt) - 3:37  
"American Boy" (Rabbitt) - 3:12

Personnel
Eddie Rabbitt - acoustic guitar, lead vocals, backing vocals
Michael Black - background vocals
Mike Brignardello - bass guitar
Larry Byrom - electric guitar
Sonny Garrish - pedal steel guitar
Aubrey Haynie - fiddle
Jim Horn - flute
Chris Leuzinger - acoustic guitar, electric guitar
Kim Morrison - background vocals
Gary Prim - keyboards
Milton Sledge - drums

References

1997 albums
Eddie Rabbitt albums